The following was a list of stations on the Metropolitana di Bologna, an old project of underground in Bologna. The project of the underground had stalled after a dispute between Regione Emilia-Romagna, the local government and the central government. A new project has been approved in 2007 and is now partially funded by the Government. On October 13, 2009 the municipal government decided to use a project financing strategy in order to provide for a quick start of the works. The new project originally included an overground segment. On October 15, 2009 the idea of building a partially overground system was abandoned, and the system is probably going to be entirely underground.

List of planned stations

Fiera Michelino
Regione-San Donato
Fiera-Regione
Liberazione
Bolognina
Stazione FS
VIII Agosto
Piazza Maggiore
Ugo Bassi
Riva Reno
Malvasia
Ospedale Maggiore
Prati di Caprara
Battindarno
Santa Viola
Pontelungo
Cinta
Borgo Panigale FS
Scala
Borgo Panigale Chiesa
Ducati
Luther King
Normandia

See also
 Bologna metropolitan railway service

References

Rapid transit in Italy